The 1916 North Carolina Tar Heels football team represented the University of North Carolina in the 1916 college football season. The team captain of the 1916 season was George Tandy.

The 1916 season was the first year UNC played at Emerson Field, named after its benefactor Isaac Emerson and built on the site of the pre-existing athletic field.

Schedule

References

North Carolina
North Carolina Tar Heels football seasons
North Carolina Tar Heels football